Appelqvist is a Swedish surname. Numbers of persons in Sweden. Alternative spellings (with population estimates):
 Appelqvist 932
 Apelqvist 472
 Appelkvist 370
 Appelquist 197
 Apelkvist 37
 Apelquist 14

Notables 
 Emilia Appelqvist (born 1990), Swedish footballer
 Ernfrid Appelqvist (1888–1966), Swedish diver
 Ingrid Appelquist (born 1931), Swedish female curler, European champion
 Thomas Appelquist (born 1941), American physicist

References

Swedish-language surnames
Surnames of Swedish origin